Pomutu/Kurti/Andra Rural LLG is a local-level government (LLG) of Manus Province, Papua New Guinea.

Wards
01. Ponam
02. Tulu 1
03. Tulu 2
04. Lahapau
05. Bundralis C/Mssn
06. Lehewa
07. Saha
08. N'drehet
09. Liap
10. Derimbat
11. Andra Island
12. Souh
13. Mundrau
14. Patlok
15. Mundripureu
16. Pundru
17. Wamandra
18. Ndrumunun

References

Local-level governments of Manus Province